Metamizole, or dipyrone, is a painkiller, spasm reliever, and fever reliever. It is most commonly given by mouth or by intravenous infusion.

Although it is available over-the-counter in some countries, it is banned in others, due to its potential for adverse events, including agranulocytosis (a dangerous lowering of the white blood cell count). A study by one of the manufacturers of the drug found the risk of agranulocytosis within the first week of treatment to be a mere 1.1 in a million, versus 5.92 in a million for diclofenac. 

It belongs to the ampyrone sulfonate family of medicines and was patented in 1922. It was first used medically in Germany under the brandname "Novalgin". For many years, it was available over-the-counter in most countries, before its withdrawal due to severe adverse effects. Metamizole is marketed under various trade names.

Medical uses
It is primarily used for perioperative pain, acute injury, colic, cancer pain, other acute/chronic forms of pain and high fever unresponsive to other agents.

Special populations
Its use in pregnancy is advised against, although animal studies are reassuring in that they show minimal risk of birth defects. Its use in the elderly and those with liver or kidney impairment is advised against, but if these groups of people must be treated, a lower dose and caution is usually advised. Its use during lactation is advised against, as it is excreted in breast milk.

Adverse effects
Metamizole has a potential of blood-related toxicity (blood dyscrasias), but causes less kidney, cardiovascular, and gastrointestinal toxicity than non-steroidal anti-inflammatory drugs (NSAIDs). Like NSAIDs, it can trigger bronchospasm or anaphylaxis, especially in those with asthma.

Serious side effects include agranulocytosis, aplastic anaemia, hypersensitivity reactions (like anaphylaxis and bronchospasm), toxic epidermal necrolysis and it may provoke acute attacks of porphyria, as it is chemically related to the sulfonamides. The relative risk for agranulocytosis appears to greatly vary according to the country of estimates on said rate and opinion on the risk is strongly divided. Genetics may play a significant role in metamizole sensitivity. It is suggested that some populations are more prone to suffer from metamizole induced agranulocytosis than others. As an example, metamizole-related agranulocytosis seems to be an adverse effect more frequent in British population as opposed to Spaniards.

According to a systematic review from 2016 Metamizole significantly increased the risk of upper gastrointestinal bleeding by a factor ranging from 1.4 to 2.7 (relative risk).

Contraindications
Previous hypersensitivity (such as agranulocytosis or anaphylaxis) to metamizole or any of the excipients (e.g. lactose) in the preparation used, acute porphyria, impaired haematopoiesis (such as due to treatment with chemotherapy agents), third trimester of pregnancy (potential for adverse effects in the newborn), lactation, children with a body weight below 16 kg, history of aspirin-induced asthma and other hypersensitivity reactions to analgesics.

Oral anticoagulants (blood thinners), lithium, captopril, triamterene and antihypertensives may also interact with metamizole, as other pyrazolones are known to interact adversely with these substances.

Overdose
It is considered fairly safe on overdose, but in these cases supportive measures are usually advised as well as measures to limit absorption (such as activated charcoal) and accelerate excretion (such as haemodialysis).

Physicochemistry
It is a sulfonic acid and comes in calcium, sodium and magnesium salt forms. Its sodium salt monohydrate form is a white/almost crystalline powder that is unstable in the presence of light, highly soluble in water and ethanol but practically insoluble in dichloromethane.

Pharmacology
Its precise mechanism of action is unknown, although it is believed that inhibiting brain and spinal cord prostaglandin (fat-like molecules that are involved in inflammation, pain and fever) synthesis might be involved. Recently, researchers uncovered another mechanism involving metamizole being a prodrug. In this proposal, not yet verified by other researchers, the metamizole itself breaks down into other chemicals that are the actual active agents. The result is a pair of cannabinoid and NSAID arachidonic acid conjugates (although not in the strict chemical meaning of the word) of metamizole's breakdown products. Despite this, studies in animals have found that the CB1 cannabinoid receptor is not involved in the analgesia induced by metamizole. Although it seems to inhibit fevers caused by prostaglandins, especially prostaglandin E2, metamizole appears to produce its therapeutic effects by means of its metabolites, especially N-methyl-4-aminoantipyrine (MAA) and 4-Aminoantipyrine (AA).

History
Ludwig Knorr was a student of Emil Fischer who won the Nobel Prize for his work on purines and sugars, which included the discovery of phenylhydrazine. In the 1880s, Knorr was trying to make quinine derivatives from phenylhydrazine, and instead made a pyrazole derivative, which after a methylation, he made into phenazone, also called antipyrine, which has been called "the 'mother' of all modern antipyretic analgesics."  Sales of that drug exploded, and in the 1890s chemists at Teerfarbenfabrik Meister, Lucius & Co. (a precursor of Hoechst AG which is now Sanofi), made another derivative called pyramidon which was three times more active than antipyrine.

In 1893, a derivative of antipyrine, aminopyrine, was made by Friedrich Stolz at Hoechst.  Yet later, chemists at Hoechst made a derivative, melubrine (sodium antipyrine aminomethanesulfonate), which was introduced in 1913; finally in 1920, metamizole was synthesized. Metamizole is a methyl derivative of melubrine and is also a more soluble prodrug of pyramidon. Metamizole was first marketed in Germany as "Novalgin" in 1922.

Society and culture

Legal status

Metamizole is banned in several countries, available by prescription in others (sometimes with strong warnings, sometimes without), and available over the counter in yet others.  For example, approval was withdrawn in Sweden (1974), the USA (1977), and India (2013, ban lifted in 2014).

Although metamizole is banned in the USA, it was reported by small surveys that 28% of Hispanics in Miami have possession of it, and 38% of Hispanics in San Diego, CA reported some usage.

Amid the opioid crisis, a study pointed out that the legal status of metamizole has a relation to the consumption of oxycodone, showing the use of those drugs were inversely correlated. Its use could be beneficial when adjusted for the addictive risk of opioids, especially on limited and controlled use of metamizole. A 2019 Israeli conference also justified the approved status as a preventive to opioid dependence, and metamizole being safer than most analgesics for renal impaired patients.

Metamizole is the most sold medication in São Paulo, Brazil, accounting for 488 tons in 2016.

In 2012, headache accounts for 70% of its use in Indonesia.

In 2018, investigators in Spain looked into Nolotil (as metamizole is known in Spain) after the death of several British people in Spain. A possible factor in these deaths might have been a side effect of metamizole that can cause agranulocytosis (a lowering of white blood cell count).

Brand names
Metamizole is generic, and in countries where it is marketed, it is available under many brand names. In Russia, it is commonly sold under the "Analgin" trade name.

In Romania metamizole is available as the original marketed pharmaceutical product by Zentiva as Algocalmin, as 500 mg immediate release tablets. It's also available as an injection with 1 g of metamizole sodium dissolved in 2 ml of solvent.

In Israel it is sold under the brand name "Optalgin", manufactured by Teva.

References 

Analgesics
Antipyretics
CYP3A4 inducers
Drugs with unknown mechanisms of action
Pyrazolones
Sulfonates
Withdrawn drugs